The maîtresse-en-titre was the chief royal mistress of the King of France. The title came into use during the reign of Henry IV and continued through the reign of Louis XV. It was a semi-official position which came with its own apartments. The position could come with significant power, as some mistresses were known to advise the king, broker favors for clients, forge alliances, and negotiate with foreign diplomats. In contrast, the title petite maîtresse was the title of a mistress who was not officially acknowledged. 

From the reign of Louis XIV, the term has often been applied, both in translation ("official mistress") and in the original French, to refer to the main mistress of any monarch or prominent man when his relationship with her is not clandestine, e.g. Vibeke Kruse, Nell Gwynn, Jeanne Baptiste d'Albert de Luynes, Lola Montez, Magda Lupescu.

French royal mistresses with the position of Maîtresse-en-titre 

While the King may have many mistresses, there was normally only one official Maîtresse-en-titre. Below are examples of those with this position. For a full list of all the mistresses of a French King, regardless of their position as official or not, please see List of French royal mistresses.  

Charles V of France
Biette de Cassinel (c. 1340 – c. 1380)

Charles VI of France
Odette de Champdivers (c. 1384–1424)

Charles VII of France
Agnès Sorel (c. 1422–1450) 
Antoinette de Maignelais (c. 1430 – c. 1461)

Louis XI of France
Phélise Regnard (1424-1474)
Marguerite de Sassenage (c. 1449–1471)

Francis I of France
Françoise de Foix (1495–1537), countess of Châteaubriant
Anne de Pisseleu d'Heilly (1508–1580), duchess of Étampes

Henry II of France
Diane de Poitiers (1499–1566)

Henry III of France
 Louise de La Béraudière du Rouhet 
 Renée de Rieux de Châteauneuf 
 Marie of Cleves, Princess of Condé

Henry IV of France
Diane d'Andoins "La Belle Corisandre" (1554–1621) 
Françoise de Montmorency (1562–?) 
Esther Imbert (1570 – c. 1593)
Antoinette de Pons (1570–1632)
Gabrielle d'Estrées (c. 1571–1599) 
Catherine Henriette de Balzac d'Entragues (1579–1633), marquise de Verneuil
Jacqueline de Bueil (c. 1580–1651) 
Charlotte des Essarts (c. 1580–1651)

Louis XIV of France

Louise Françoise de la Baume le Blanc de la Vallière (1644–1710), duchesse de la Vallière and duchesse de Vaujours 
Françoise-Athénaïs de Rochechouart de Mortemart, marquise de Montespan (1640–1707)
Françoise d'Aubigné, marquise de Maintenon (1635–1719), married the King in 1683
Isabelle de Ludres (1687–1722) 
Marie Angélique de Scoraille de Roussille (1661–1681), duchess of Fontanges

Louis XV of France
Louise Julie de Mailly (1710–1751), comtesse de Mailly
Pauline-Félicité de Mailly (1712–1741), marquise de Vintimille
Diane-Adélaïde de Mailly (1713–1760), duchess de Lauraguais
Marie-Anne de Mailly (1717–1744), duchess de Châteauroux
Jeanne-Antoinette Poisson (better known as Madame de Pompadour) (1721–1764), marquise de Pompadour
Marie-Jeanne Bécu (better known as Madame du Barry) (1743–1793), comtesse de Barry

Louis XVIII of France
Zoé Talon, comtesse du Cayla (1785–1852)

See also
Henry IV of France's wives and mistresses
Favourite

References

External links
 List of maîtresses du Roi-Soleil (French)

 Maitresse
1340s establishments in France
1852 disestablishments in France
Lists of royal mistresses
Lists of French women